Arsyonovo (Arsen) is a rural locality (a selo) and the administrative centre of Sakmarsky Selsoviet, Zianchurinsky District, Bashkortostan, Russia. The population was 560 as of 2010. There are 9 streets.

Geography 
Arsyonovo is located 126 km southeast of Isyangulovo (the district's administrative centre) by road. Ryskulovo is the nearest rural locality.

References 

Rural localities in Zianchurinsky District